Gerald Clarence Smoak, Sr. (September 18, 1930 - December 7, 2018) was an American politician in the state of South Carolina. He served in the South Carolina House of Representatives from 1967 to 1970, representing Colleton County, South Carolina. He is a lawyer and former judge.

References

1930 births
2018 deaths
People from Colleton County, South Carolina
Democratic Party members of the South Carolina House of Representatives
South Carolina lawyers
20th-century American lawyers